Lucas Henrique da Silva (born 5 February 1995), known as Lucas Áfrico, is a Brazilian professional footballer who plays as a central defender for Portuguese club Estoril.

Football career
On 27 June 2018, Lucas Áfrico signed a five years contract with Marítimo.

On 2 July 2021, he returned to Estoril on a permanent basis, after playing there on loan earlier.

References

External links

1995 births
Footballers from São Paulo
Living people
Brazilian footballers
Association football defenders
Campeonato Paranaense players
Associação Atlética Flamengo players
Santos FC players
Londrina Esporte Clube players
Primeira Liga players
Liga Portugal 2 players
Campeonato de Portugal (league) players
C.S. Marítimo players
G.D. Estoril Praia players
Brazilian expatriate footballers
Expatriate footballers in Portugal
Brazilian expatriate sportspeople in Portugal